The UEFA European Championship is the main football competition of the men's national football teams governed by UEFA (the Union of European Football Associations). Held every four years since 1960, in the even-numbered year between World Cup tournaments, it was originally called the UEFA European Nations' Cup, changing to the current name in 1968. Starting with the 1996 tournament, specific championships are often referred to in the form "Euro 2008" or whichever year is appropriate.
Prior to entering the tournament all teams other than the host nations (which qualify automatically) compete in a qualifying process.

The Republic of Ireland have participated in three European Championship finals, those held in 1988, 2012 and 2016.	
	
The side have played ten matches: winning two, drawing two and losing six. They have scored six goals and conceded sixteen. In 2012, they equalled the worst performance by a team in European Championship history. They finished bottom of their group and were the first team eliminated from the tournament following a 4–0 defeat to Spain in their second game. In 2016, the nation reached the second round for the first time, following a 1–0 group stage victory against Italy.

Overall record

Euro 1988

Qualification

Ireland qualified for the finals after winning Group 7 of the qualifying tournament. A late goal by Scotland's Gary Mackay against Bulgaria in Sofia ensured that Ireland won the group ahead of Bulgaria.

Squad

Tournament
Group stage

Euro 2012

Qualification

Ireland qualified for the finals after winning an unprecedented 5–1 aggregate play-off win against Estonia in the qualifying tournament. A 4–0 victory away in Tallinn and a 1–1 draw in Dublin ensured Ireland's qualification for UEFA Euro 2012.

Squad

On 7 May 2012, Giovanni Trapattoni announced his 23-man squad list for Euro 2012, along with a five-man stand-by list. Keith Fahey withdrew with a groin injury on 26 May and was replaced by Paul Green. On 29 May 2012, Kevin Foley was replaced by Paul McShane. The Ireland team was the only squad at the tournament to consist entirely of players from foreign leagues.

Tournament
Group stage

Euro 2016

Squad

The Republic of Ireland announced their final squad for Euro 2016 on 31 May 2016. The group contained eight players who began their senior careers in Ireland's domestic league, the most for any Irish squad at a major tournament.

Tournament
Ireland began their campaign on 13 June at the Stade de France against Sweden. In the first half, John O'Shea almost got on the end of a set-piece in front of goal and Jeff Hendrick  smashed the crossbar with a long range shot. The match was scoreless at half-time. In the 48th minute Séamus Coleman got down the right wing and crossed for Wes Hoolahan to catch the ball on the half volley with his right foot from twelve yards out to put Ireland in front.	
In the 71st minute Zlatan Ibrahimović cut in on the left side and crossed dangerously with Ciaran Clark heading the ball into his own net from close range.	
The match finished in a 1–1 draw.

On 18 June, Ireland lost 3–0 to Belgium in their second group game in Bordeaux.	
The match was 0–0 at half-time before Romelu Lukaku opened the scoring in the 48th minute with a low shot to the right corner. It was 2–0 in the 61st minute when Axel Witsel headed into the net from a Thomas Meunier cross from the right.	
The third goal came in the 70th minute, again from Romelu Lukaku who finished easily with a low shot to the right of the goalkeeper after a break away from Eden Hazard on the right.	

On 22 June, Ireland defeated Italy 1–0 in their final group game to qualify for the knockout phase and a round of 16 match against hosts France.	
The only goal came in the 85th minute, a header by Robbie Brady after a cross from Wes Hoolahan on the right.

On 26 June, Ireland played France in the round of 16, at the Parc Olympique Lyonnais in Lyon.	
They took an early lead in the 2nd minute when Robbie Brady scored with a penalty, shooting low to the right of the goalkeeper and in off the post, after Shane Long had been fouled by Paul Pogba. Antoine Griezmann leveled the match in the 58th minute with a header after a cross from Bacary Sagna on the right and then scored a second three minutes later with a low shot to the goalkeepers left. Shane Duffy was sent-off in the 66th minutes when he fouled Griezmann as the last man.	
France went on to win the game 2–1 to advance to the quarter-finals.	

Group stage

Ranking of third-placed teams 

Knockout phase

Round of 16

See also
 Republic of Ireland at the FIFA World Cup

References

 
Countries at the UEFA European Championship
Europe